Michael Norman Rouleau  (born July 4, 1967) is a Canadian Forces officer serving as a lieutenant-general in the Canadian Army. He was the vice chief of the Defence Staff from July 15, 2020 until June 14, 2021.

Education 
Rouleau obtained a Bachelor of Arts degree in Political Science from the University of Manitoba. He would later graduate from the Royal Military College of Canada with a Masters in Defence Studies and a Master of Arts Degree in Security, Management, and Defence Policy.

Military career
Rouleau joined the Canadian Armed Forces (CAF) in 1985 as an artillery officer.

In 1994 he became a Special Operation Assaulter with Joint Task Force 2 (JTF2)

In 1999, he retired from the CAF and joined the ranks of the Ottawa Carleton Regional Police Service as an emergency response officer. However, he re-enrolled in the CAF in 2002 following the events of the September 11 attacks against the United States.

Rouleau was appointed Commander of the Canadian Special Operations Forces Command in February 2014. He was Commander of the Canadian Joint Operations Command from June 2018 to March 2020 before being replaced by Lieutenant-General Christopher J. Coates.

In July 2020, Rouleau was named Vice Chief of the Defence Staff. In March 2021, Frances J. Allen was announced as his successor and he was named a strategic advisor to the chief of the Defence Staff on future capabilities, pending Allen's completion of service as Canada's Representative to the NATO Military Committee. He resigned prematurely from the role on June 14, 2021, after controversy over a golf game he played with former Chief of the Defence Staff Jonathan Vance during an investigation into the latter for sexual misconduct. As Vice Chief of the Defence Staff, Rouleau was the immediate superior to the Provost Marshal in charge of the Canadian Forces National Investigation Service.

He retired in September 2022.

Honours and decorations 
Rouleau has received the following orders and decorations during his military career:
110px

110px

110px

References

Canadian generals
Living people
1967 births
University of Manitoba alumni
Royal Military College of Canada alumni
Vice Chiefs of the Defence Staff (Canada)
Commanders of the Order of Military Merit (Canada)
Canadian police officers